Naim Thjeel Yousir Al-Rubaie (born 1970)
is an Iraqi independent politician who was Communications Minister from 2018 to 2020 in the Government of Adil Abdul-Mahdi. He was approved by the Council of Representatives on 24 October 2018.

He earned a PhD degree in computer engineering from Hacettepe University 2014.

Just two weeks after his approval, the Accountability and Justice Commission, which vets officials, wrote to parliament to notify them that Al-Rubaye had been a mid-level Ba'ath Party official and had been the Director of the Directorate of Information and Communication Technology – Iraqi National Intelligence Service (2015–2018).

Sources

Government ministers of Iraq
Living people
1970 births